The University of Puerto Rico at Bayamón (UPRB or UPR-Bayamón) is a public university in Bayamón, Puerto Rico. It is part of the University of Puerto Rico System (UPR) and is better known as CUTB from its previous name of Colegio Universitario Tecnológico de Bayamón in Spanish.  It is the third largest campus in the whole UPR system in terms of population.

The university offers undergraduate programs. It also administers an Extended University program for students who are unable to comply with a regular daytime schedule, as well as partnerships with businesses and industries in the area where students can do internships and practical programs before graduation. UPR-Bayamón excels in the Liga Atlética Interuniversitaria's (LAI) Women Basketball, with an historic 10 consecutive championships, and Cheerleading.  Also, it holds first place 5 years in a row in the dance team's competition.

See also 

2010 University of Puerto Rico Strike

References

External links 
 Official website

Bayamon
Bayamón, Puerto Rico
Buildings and structures in Bayamón, Puerto Rico
1971 establishments in Puerto Rico
Educational institutions established in 1971
Liga Atletica Interuniversitaria de Puerto Rico
NCAA Division II independents